Sette is an extended play by the Brazilian recording artist Claudia Leitte, released on October 30, 2014. The EP brings the songs "Matimba", "Cartório", "Foragido" featuring Brazilian reggae singer Edson Gomes, "Carreira Solo", "Abraço Coletivo" and "Salvador". For the release of the EP on CD, a remix version of "Matimba" featured Big Sean and MC Guimê was included in the track list. According to Leitte, the album was done "thinking in the summer, Brazilian Carnival, on the beach and barbecue".

Track listing

Release history

References 

2014 EPs
Claudia Leitte albums